Amen is a 2011 South Korean drama film written and directed by Kim Ki-duk, starring Kim Ye-na. Shot in Europe, it follows a Korean girl on a mysterious journey. The film premiered in competition at the 2011 San Sebastián International Film Festival.

Cast
 Kim Ye-na as the girl
 Kim Ki-duk as gas-masked rapist

Reception
Fionnuala Halligan wrote in Screen Daily: "Amen is first and foremost a conceptual piece of work and viewers will either hop on or off Kim's train - small matters of logic or continuity won't matter to those who want to take the trip. ... Distinguishing the film is talented young Korean actress Kim Ye-na whose watchable, irregular, face draws you into Kim's obsessions."

References

External links
 

2011 drama films
2011 films
Films directed by Kim Ki-duk
2010s Korean-language films
South Korean drama films
2010s South Korean films